Jorge Rico Vázquez (born 30 August 1996) is a Spanish footballer who plays for CA Pinto as a midfielder.

Club career
An AD Alcorcón youth graduate, Rico made his first team debut on 31 May 2015, before even appearing with the reserves, coming on as a second-half substitute for Máyor in a 1–1 home draw against CD Numancia in the Segunda División. He subsequently featured with the B-side in the Tercera División.

On 26 January 2018, after spending the first half of the campaign nursing a knee injury, Rico joined fellow fourth division side CD Móstoles URJC.

References

External links

1996 births
Living people
Footballers from Madrid
Spanish footballers
Association football midfielders
Segunda División players
Segunda División B players
Tercera División players
AD Alcorcón footballers
AD Alcorcón B players
CD Móstoles URJC players
Internacional de Madrid players